Julien Falchero (born 2 March 1997) is a French racing driver.

Career

GP3 Series
In December 2016, Falchero partook in post-season testing with Campos Racing. He was signed to the team the following month.

Racing record

Career summary

† As Falchero was a guest driver, he was ineligible for points.

Complete GP3 Series results
(key) (Races in bold indicate pole position) (Races in italics indicate fastest lap)

Complete European Le Mans Series results

‡ Half points awarded as less than 75% of race distance was completed.

American open-wheel racing results
(key)

Indy Lights

References

External links
 

1997 births
Living people
Sportspeople from Valence, Drôme
French racing drivers
Formula Renault 2.0 Alps drivers
Formula Renault Eurocup drivers
Formula Renault 2.0 NEC drivers
French GP3 Series drivers
Indy Lights drivers
Arden International drivers
MRF Challenge Formula 2000 Championship drivers
European Le Mans Series drivers
R-ace GP drivers
Campos Racing drivers
G-Drive Racing drivers
Belardi Auto Racing drivers
Graff Racing drivers
Le Mans Cup drivers